Zigzagiceras is an extinct cephalopod genus belonging to the order Ammonoidea, that lived during the upper Bathonian stage of the Middle Jurassic. They were fast-moving nektonic carnivores.

References
Notes

Jurassic ammonites
Bathonian life
Ammonitida genera
Perisphinctidae